Donald Arthur Schulze (born September 27, 1962) is a former Major League Baseball pitcher and current minor league pitching coach. 

Schulze graduated from Lake Park High School in 1981. He also pitched three seasons in Japan: from  until  for the Orix BlueWave. He currently serves as the pitching coach for the Lansing Lugnuts.

Since , Schulze has worked in the Oakland Athletics organization as a pitching coach. He was with the Arizona League Athletics in 2006, the Kane County Cougars in 2007 to 2008, and the Stockton Ports in 2009 to 2010. In November 2010, he was named to the staff of the Midland RockHounds. He was moved to the Beloit Snappers for the 2018 and 2019 seasons, and to the Lugnuts from 2021 onward.

Notes

Sources
, or Retrosheet, or Pura Pelota (Venezuelan Winter League)

1962 births
Living people
American expatriate baseball players in Japan
Baseball players from Illinois
Buffalo Bisons (minor league) players
Chicago Cubs players
Cleveland Indians players
Columbus Clippers players
Gulf Coast Cubs players
Iowa Cubs players
Maine Guides players 
Major League Baseball pitchers 
New York Mets players
New York Yankees players
Orix BlueWave players
Orix Braves players
People from Roselle, Illinois
Quad Cities Cubs players
Rochester Red Wings players
Salinas Spurs players
San Diego Padres players
Tidewater Tides players
Tigres de Aragua players
American expatriate baseball players in Venezuela
Toledo Mud Hens players